Miroslav Latiak (born 19 March 1981) is a Slovak footballer who currently plays as a forward for MFK Tatran Liptovský Mikuláš of the Slovak Slovak 2. liga.

Prior to joining Geylang United, Latiak most notably played for MFK Ružomberok in his native Slovakia. However, he shuffled between the Corgoň Liga (Slovak Superliga) team and the 2. slovenská futbalová liga (Slovak Second Division) team.

On 20 April 2008, Latiak opened his S-League scoring accounts with a brace as he helped his side to a 2-1 win over Woodlands Wellington at the Woodlands Stadium.

External links

References

1981 births
Living people
Slovak footballers
Singapore Premier League players
Geylang International FC players
MFK Tatran Liptovský Mikuláš players
MFK Ružomberok players
MŠK Rimavská Sobota players
1. FC Tatran Prešov players
Slovak Super Liga players
Expatriate footballers in Singapore

Association football forwards